The Road Ahead may refer to:

 The Road Ahead (album), 2004, by Bradley Joseph
 The Road Ahead (magazine), published by the Royal Automobile Club of Queensland, Australia
 The Road Ahead: America's Creeping Revolution, a 1949 book by John T. Flynn
 The Road Ahead (Bill Gates book), 1995
The Road Ahead, 2021 Singapore's National Day celebrations theme song.

See also
 "Roads Ahead", a 2011 single by Canadian rock band Big Sugar